松原市 may refer to:
Songyuan, a city in Jilin, China
Matsubara, Osaka, a city in Osaka, Japan